The Yellow River or Huang He (Chinese: , Mandarin: Huáng hé ) is the second-longest river in China, after the Yangtze River, and the sixth-longest river system in the world at the estimated length of . Originating in the Bayan Har Mountains in Qinghai province of Western China, it flows through nine provinces, and it empties into the Bohai Sea near the city of Dongying in Shandong province.

The Yellow River's basin was the birthplace of ancient Chinese, and, by extension, Far Eastern civilization, and it was the most prosperous region in early Chinese history. There are frequent devastating floods and course changes produced by the continual elevation of the river bed, sometimes above the level of its surrounding farm fields.

Etymology 
Early Chinese literature including the Yu Gong or Tribute of Yu dating to the Warring States period (475–221 BC) refers to the Yellow River as simply  (Old Chinese: *C.gˤaj, Modern Beijing Mandarin: // or in pinyin Hé), a character that has come to mean "river" in modern usage. An early attestation of the name  (Eastern Han Chinese: *ɣuaŋ-gɑi; Middle Chinese: Huang Ha) in the Eastern Han treatise Kongcongzi 孔叢子 "The Many Kong Family Master's Anthology", attributed to Confucius' descendant Kong Fu 孔鮒 (c. 264-208 BCE). The adjective "yellow" describes the perennial color of the muddy water in the lower course of the river, which arises from soil (loess) being carried downstream. Its yellow colour and central position in China are associated in traditional cardinal directions.

One of its older Mongolian names was the "Black River", because the river runs clear before it enters the Loess Plateau, but the current name of the river among Inner Mongolians is Ȟatan Gol ("Queen River"). In Mongolia itself, it is simply called the Šar Mörön ("Yellow River"). The river is mentioned in the Kul Tigin stele as the "Green River" (Old Turkic : yašïl ügüz, 𐰖𐱁𐰞𐰽𐰺𐰍).

In Qinghai, the river's Tibetan name is "River of the Peacock"

History

Yellow River Civilization

Dynamics 

The Yellow river first formed between 56 million and 34 million years ago during the Eocene epoch, while the familiar shape appeared around 7 thousand years ago.

The river has long been critical to the development of northern China, and is regarded by scholars as one cradle of civilization. Flooding of the river has also caused much destruction, including multiple floods that have resulted in the deaths of over one million people. Among the deadliest were the 1332–33 flood during the Yuan dynasty, the 1887 flood during the Qing dynasty which killed anywhere from 900,000 to 2 million people, and a Republic of China era 1931 flood (part of a massive number of floods that year) that killed 1–4 million people.

The cause of the floods is the large amount of fine-grained loess carried by the river from the Loess Plateau, which is continuously deposited along the bottom of its channel. The sedimentation causes natural dams to slowly accumulate. These subaqueous dams are unpredictable and generally undetectable. Eventually, the enormous amount of water needs to find a new way to the sea, forcing it to take the path of least resistance.  When this happens, it bursts out across the flat North China Plain, sometimes taking a new channel and inundating most farmland, cities or towns in its path.

The traditional Chinese response of building higher and higher levees along the banks sometimes also contributed to the severity of the floods: When flood water did break through the levees, it could no longer drain back into the river bed as it would after a normal flood, as the river bed was sometimes now higher than the surrounding countryside.

Another historical source of devastating floods is the collapse of upstream ice dams in Inner Mongolia with an accompanying sudden release of vast quantities of impounded water. There have been 11 such major floods in the past century, each causing tremendous loss of life and property. Nowadays, explosives dropped from aircraft are used to break the ice dams before they become dangerous.

Before modern dams appeared in China, the Yellow River used to be extremely prone to flooding. In the 2,540 years from 595 BC to 1946 AD, the Yellow River has been reckoned to have flooded 1,593 times, shifting its course 26 times noticeably and nine times severely. These floods include some of the deadliest natural disasters ever recorded. Before modern disaster management, when floods occurred, some of the population might initially die from drowning and many more would suffer later from the ensuing famine and spread of diseases.

Ancient times

In Chinese mythology, the giant Kua Fu drained the Yellow River and the Wei River to quench his burning thirst as he pursued the Sun. Historical documents from the Spring and Autumn period and Qin dynasty indicate that the Yellow River at that time flowed considerably north of its present course. These accounts show that after the river passed Luoyang, it flowed along the border between Shanxi and Henan Provinces, then continued along the border between Hebei and Shandong before emptying into Bohai Bay near present-day Tianjin. Another outlet followed essentially the present course.

The river left these paths in 602 BC and shifted several hundred kilometers to the east. Sabotage of dikes, canals, and reservoirs and deliberate flooding of rival states became a standard military tactic during the Warring States period. As the Yellow River valley was the major entryway to the Guanzhong area and the state of Qin from the North China Plain, Qin heavily fortified the Hangu Pass; it saw numerous battles and was also an important chokepoint protecting the Han capitals of Chang'an and Luoyang. Major flooding in AD 11 is credited with the downfall of the short-lived Xin dynasty, and another flood in AD 70 returned the river north of Shandong on essentially its present course.

Medieval times

From around the beginning of the 3rd century, the importance of the Hangu Pass was reduced, with the major fortifications and military bases moved upriver to Tongguan. In AD 923, the desperate Later Liang general Duan Ning again broke the dikes, flooding  in a failed attempt to protect his realm's capital from the Later Tang. A similar proposal from the Song engineer Li Chun concerning flooding the lower reaches of the river to protect the central plains from the Khitai was overruled in 1020: the Chanyuan Treaty between the two states had expressly forbidden the Song from establishing new moats or changing river courses.

Breaches occurred regardless: one at Henglong in 1034 divided the course in three and repeatedly flooded the northern regions of Dezhou and Bozhou. The Song worked for five years futilely attempting to restore the previous courseusing over 35,000 employees, 100,000 conscripts, and 220,000 tons of wood and bamboo in a single yearbefore abandoning the project in 1041. The more sluggish river then occasioned a breach at Shanghu that sent the main outlet north towards Tianjin in 1048

In 1128, Song troops under the Kaifeng governor Du Chong  Dù Chōng, d.1141) breached the southern dikes of the Yellow River in an effort to stop the advancing Jin army. The resulting major river avulsion allowed the Yellow to capture the Si and other tributaries of the Huai River. For the first time in recorded history, the Yellow River shifted completely south of Shandong Peninsula and flowed into the Yellow Sea. By 1194, the mouth of the Huai had been blocked. The buildup of silt deposits was such that even after the Yellow River later shifted its course, the Huai could no longer flow along its historic course, but instead, its water pools into Hongze Lake and then runs southward toward the Yangtze River.

A flood in 1344 returned the Yellow River south of Shandong. The Yuan dynasty was waning, and the emperor forced enormous teams to build new embankments for the river. The terrible conditions helped to fuel rebellions that led to the founding of the Ming dynasty. The course changed again in 1391 when the river flooded from Kaifeng to Fengyang in Anhui. It was finally stabilized by the eunuch Li Xing during the public works projects following the 1494 flood. The river flooded many times in the 16th century, including in 1526, 1534, 1558, and 1587. Each flood affected the river's lower course.

The 1642 flood was man-made, caused by the attempt of the Ming governor of Kaifeng to use the river to destroy the peasant rebels under Li Zicheng who had been besieging the city for the past six months. He directed his men to break the dikes in an attempt to flood the rebels, but destroyed his own city instead: the flood and the ensuing famine and plague are estimated to have killed 300,000 of the city's previous population of 378,000. The once-prosperous city was nearly abandoned until its rebuilding under the Kangxi Emperor in the Qing dynasty.

The question of how aggressively flooding should be controlled, and whether it should be steered back to its original channels when it migrated, was a topic of controversy in the imperial court. Rival cliques made arguments based on budgetary, technical and strategic criteria. Geographer Charles Greer identifies two competing schools of thought on how to control the Yellow River. One, which he identifies as Confucian, advocated containing the river between higher levees, thus maximizing the amount of river basin land that could be cultivated. The other, which he associates with Taoism, favored lower levees separated by as much as 5-10 kilometers. In one particular long-running debate during the 11th century reigns of the Renzong and Shenzong emperors, when the river repeatedly broke its levees and migrated north and west, officials battled over whether expensive measures should be taken to return the river to its former channels. The Shenzong emperor ultimately decreed that the river be allowed to remain in its new course.

Traditional flood control techniques made use of levees, revetments to absorb the energy of the water, overflow basins, drainage canals and polders. Treatises on traditional flood control techniques were written by officials such as Pan Jixun, who argued that joining branches of the river increased the water's power and this in turn increased its ability to flush sediment. The difficult situation around the confluence of the Yellow River, the Huai, and the Grand Canal, however, still led to a major flood of the regional center Sizhou and Pan's dismissal from court. Subsequently, the river's 1680 flood entirely submerged Sizhou and the nearby Ming Zuling tombs beneath Hongze Lake for centuries until modern irrigation and flood control lowered the water level enough to permit their excavation and the tombs' restoration.

Recent times

Between 1851 and 1855, the Yellow River returned to the north amid the floods that provoked the Nien and Taiping Rebellions. The 1887 flood has been estimated to have killed between 900,000 and 2 million people, and is the second-worst natural disaster in history (excluding famines and epidemics). The Yellow River more or less adopted its present course during the 1897 flood.

The 1931 flood killed an estimated 1,000,000 to 4,000,000, and is the worst natural disaster recorded (excluding famines and epidemics).

On 9 June 1938, during the Second Sino-Japanese War, Nationalist troops under Chiang Kai-shek broke the levees holding back the river near the village of Huayuankou in Henan, causing what has been called by Canadian historian, Diana Lary, a "war-induced natural disaster". The goal of the operation was to stop the advancing Japanese troops by following a strategy of  "using water as a substitute for soldiers" (yishui daibing). The 1938 flood of an area covering  took some 500,000 to 900,000 Chinese lives, along with an unknown number of Japanese soldiers. The flood prevented the Japanese Army from taking Zhengzhou, on the southern bank of the Yellow River, but did not stop them from reaching their goal of capturing Wuhan, which was the temporary seat of the Chinese government and straddles the Yangtze River.

Geography

The source tributaries drain into Gyaring Lake and Ngoring Lake on the western edge of Golog Prefecture high in the Bayan Har Mountains of Qinghai.

The Yellow River passes through seven present-day provinces and two autonomous regions, namely (from west to east) Qinghai, Sichuan, Gansu, Ningxia, Inner Mongolia, Shaanxi, Shanxi, Henan, and Shandong. Major cities along the present course of the Yellow River include (from west to east) Lanzhou, Yinchuan, Wuhai, Baotou, Luoyang, Zhengzhou, Kaifeng, and Jinan. The current mouth of the Yellow River is located at Kenli County, Shandong.

The river is commonly divided into three stages. These are roughly the northeast of the mountainous Tibetan Plateau, the Ordos Loop and Loess Plateau, and the North China Plain. However, different scholars have different opinions on how the three stages are divided. This article mainly adopts the division used by the Yellow River Conservancy Commission.

The Yellow River derived sediments have been transported out of the Bohai Sea, all way to the North Yellow Sea and South Yellow Sea, and formed a Distal Depocenter around the Shandong Peninsula.

Upper reaches

The upper reaches of the Yellow River constitute a segment starting from its source in the Bayan Har Mountains and ending at Hekou Town (Togtoh County), Inner Mongolia just before it turns sharply to the south. Along this length, the elevation of the Yellow River drops , with an average grade of 0.10%.

The source section flows mainly through pastures, swamps, and knolls between the Bayan Har Mountains, and the Anemaqen (Amne Machin) Mountains in Qinghai. The river water is clear and flows steadily. Crystal clear lakes are characteristic of this section. The two main lakes along this section are Lake Gyaring (Zhaling) and Lake Ngoring (Eling), with capacities of 4.7 billion and 10.8 billion m3 (166 and 381 billion ft3), respectively. At elevations over ) above sea level they are the two largest plateau freshwater lakes nationwide. A significant amount of land in the Yellow River's source area has been designated as the Sanjiangyuan ("'Three Rivers' Sources") National Nature Reserve, to protect the source region of the Yellow River, the Yangtze, and the Mekong.

Flowing east at the eastern edge of the Amne Machin Mountains, the Yellow River enters Maqu County in Gansu.  Here, the river skirts through the high-altitude peat bog known as the Zoigê Wetlands and makes a sharp turn towards the northwest forming the border between Maqu and Zoigê County in Sichuan.  Flowing now along the northern edge of Amne Machin, the river reenters Qinghai and gradually curves north towards the Longyang Gorge at Xinghai.

The valley section stretches from Longyang Gorge in Qinghai to Qingtong Gorge in Gansu. Steep cliffs line both sides of the river. The water bed is narrow and the average drop is large, so the flow in this section is extremely turbulent and fast. There are 20 gorges in this section, the most famous of these being the Longyang, Jishi, Liujia, Bapan, and Qingtong gorges. The flow conditions in this section makes it the best location for hydroelectric plants.  The Yellow River exits Qinghai for the second and final time in these gorges and enters Gansu for the second time just before Liujia Gorge.  Downstream from the Yanguo Gorge, the provincial capital of Lanzhou is built upon the Yellow River's banks.  The Yellow River flows northeasterly out of Gansu and into Ningxia before the Qingtong Gorge.

After emerging from the Qingtong Gorge, the river comes into a section of vast alluvial plains, the Yinchuan Plain and Hetao Plain. In this section, the regions along the river are mostly deserts and grasslands, with very few tributaries. The flow is slow. It is historically the most important irrigation plain along the Yellow River.

Middle reaches

The Ordos Loop formed by an enormous twist of the Yellow River, beginning at Zhongning County in Ningxia and ending with a drastic eastward turn at its confluence with the Wei at Tongguan in Shaanxi. However, the official division for the middle reaches of the river run from Hekou in Togtoh County, Inner Mongolia, to Zhengzhou, Henan. There are 30 large tributaries along the middle reaches, and the water flow is increased by 43.5% on this stage. The middle reaches contribute 92% of the river's silts.

The middle stream of the Yellow River passes through the Loess Plateau, where substantial erosion takes place. The large amount of mud and sand discharged into the river makes the Yellow River the most sediment-laden river in the world. The highest recorded annual level of silts discharged into the Yellow River is 3.91 billion tons in 1933. The highest silt concentration level was recorded in 1977 at 920 kg/m3 (57.4 lb/ft3). These sediments later deposit in the slower lower reaches of the river, elevating the river bed and creating the famous "river above ground". From Hekou to Yumenkou, the river passes through the longest series of continuous valleys on its main course, collectively called the Jinshan Valley. The abundant hydrodynamic resources stored in this section make it the second most suitable area to build hydroelectric power plants. The famous Hukou Waterfall is in the lower part of this valley on the border of Shanxi and Shaanxi.

Lower reaches
The basin area in this stage is only , a mere 3% of the total, because few tributaries add to the flow in this stage; nearly all rivers to the south drain into the Huai River, whereas those to the north drain into the Hai River. The Huai River Basin, for example, is separated from the Yellow River Basin by the south dike of the Yellow River.

The silts received from the middle reaches form sediments here, elevating the river bed. Excessive sediment deposits have raised the riverbed several meters above the surrounding ground.

Tributaries

Tributaries of the Yellow River listed from its source to its mouth include:
White River
Daxia River 
Tao River 
Huang Shui 
Datong River 
Zhuanglang River
Zuli River
Qingshui River
Dahei River
Kuye River
Wuding River 
Fen River 
Wei River (the Wei River is the largest of these tributaries)
Luo River 
Qin River 
Dawen River

Characteristics

The Yellow River is notable for the large amount of silt it carries—1.6 billion tons annually at the point where it descends from the Loess Plateau. If it is running to the sea with sufficient volume, 1.4 billion tons are carried to the sea per year. One estimate gives 34 kilograms of silt per cubic meter as opposed to 10 for the Colorado and 1 for the Nile.

Its average discharge is said to be 2,110 cubic meters per second (32,000 for the Yangtze), with a maximum of 25,000 and minimum of 245. However, since 1972, it often runs dry before it reaches the sea. The low volume is due to increased agricultural irrigation, increased by a factor of five since 1950. Water diverted from the river as of 1999 served 140 million people and irrigated 74,000 km2 (48,572 mi2) of land. The Yellow River delta totals 8,000 square kilometers (3,090 mi2). However, with the decrease in silt reaching the sea, it has been reported to be shrinking slightly each year since 1996 through erosion.

The highest volume occurs during the rainy season from July to October, when 60% of the annual volume of the river flows. Maximum demand for irrigation is needed between March and June. In order to capture excess water for use when needed and for flood control and electricity generation, several dams have been built, but their expected life is limited due to the high silt load. A proposed South–North Water Transfer Project involves several schemes to divert water from the Yangtze River: one in the western headwaters of the rivers where they are closest to one another, another from the upper reaches of the Han River, and a third using the route of the old Grand Canal.

Due to its heavy load of silt the Yellow River is a depositing streamthat is, it deposits part of its carried burden of soil in its bed in stretches where it is flowing slowly. These deposits elevate the riverbed which flows between natural levees in its lower reaches. Should a flood occur, the river may break out of the levees into the surrounding lower flood plain and take
a new channel. Historically this has occurred about once every hundred years. In modern times, considerable effort has been made to strengthen levees and control floods.

Hydroelectric power dams

Below is the list of hydroelectric power stations built on the Yellow River, arranged according to the first year of operation (in brackets):

Sanmenxia Dam (1960; Sanmenxia, Henan)
Sanshenggong Dam (1966)
Qingtong Gorge hydroelectric power station (1968; Qingtongxia, Ningxia)
Liujiaxia Dam (Liujia Gorge) (1974; Yongjing County, Gansu)
Lijiaxia Dam (1997) (Jainca County, Qinghai)
Yanguoxia Dam (Yanguo Gorge) hydroelectric power station (1975; Yongjing County, Gansu)
Tianqiao Dam (1977)
Bapanxia Dam (Bapan Gorge) (1980; Xigu District, Lanzhou, Gansu)
Longyangxia Dam (1992; Gonghe County, Qinghai)
Da Gorge hydroelectric power station (1998)
Li Gorge hydroelectric power station (1999)
Wanjiazhai Dam (1999; Pianguan County, Shaanxi and Inner Mongolia)
Xiaolangdi Dam (2001) (Jiyuan, Henan)
Laxiwa Dam (2010) (Guide County, Qinghai)
Yangqu Dam (2016) (Xinghai County, Qinghai)
Maerdang Dam (2018) (Maqên County, Qinghai)

As reported in 2000, the 7 largest hydro power plants (Longyangxia, Lijiaxia, Liujiaxia, Yanguoxia, Bapanxia, Daxia and Qinglongxia) had the total installed capacity of 5,618 MW.

Crossings

The main bridges and ferries by the province names in the order of downstream to upstream are:

Shandong
 Dongying Yellow River Bridge
 Shengli Yellow River Bridge (Dongying)
 Lijin Yellow River Bridge (Dongying)
 Binzhou Yellow River Road-Railway Bridge
 Binzhou Yellow River Highway Bridge
 Binzhou–Laiwu Expressway Binzhou Yellow River Bridge (Binzhou–Zibo)
 Huiqing Yellow River Bridge (Binzhou–Zibo)
 Jiyang Yellow River Bridge (Jinan)
 G20 Qingdao–Yinchuan Expressway Jinan Yellow River Bridge (Jinan)
 Jinan Yellow River Bridge
 Luokou Yellow River Railway Bridge (Jinan)
 Jinan Jianbang Yellow River Bridge
 Beijing–Shanghai High-speed Railway Jinan Yellow River Bridge (Jinan–Dezhou)
 Beijing–Taipei Expressway Jinan Yellow River Bridge (Jinan–Dezhou)
 Beijing–Shanghai Railway Jinan Yellow River New Bridge (Jinan–Dezhou)
 Pingyin Yellow River Bridge (Jinan-Liaocheng)

Shandong–Henan
 Beijing–Kowloon Railway Sunkou Yellow River Bridge (Jining–Puyang)
 Juancheng Yellow River Highway Bridge (Heze–Puyang)
 Dongming Yellow River Highway Bridge (Heze–Puyang)

Henan
 Kaifeng Yellow River Bridge (Kaifeng)
 Zhengzhou Yellow River Bridge (Zhengzhou)

Shanxi–Henan
 Sanmen Yellow River Bridge (Sanmenxia)

Shaanxi–Henan
 Hancheng Yumenkou Yellow River Bridge

Ningxia
 Yinchuan Yellow River Bridge (Yinchuan)

Inner Mongolia
 Baotou Yellow River Bridge (Baotou)

Gansu
 Lanzhou Yellow River Bridge
 Zhongshan Bridge (Lanzhou)

Qinghai
 Dari Yellow River Bridge

Fauna

Fish

The Yellow River basin is rich in fish, being the home of more than 160 native species in 92 genera and 28 families, including 19 species found nowhere else in the world (endemic). However, due to habitat loss, pollution, introduced species and overfishing many of the natives have declined or disappeared entirely; several are recognized as threatened on China's Red List. Dams and their reservoirs have increased the habitat for species of slow-moving and static waters, while it excluded species of flowing waters and prevented the up- and down-stream breeding migration of others. In the 2000s, only 80 native fish in 63 genera and 18 families were recorded in the Yellow River basin. In contrast, introduced fish have risen in both abundance and number of species; only one introduced fish species was recorded in the 1960s when ichthyologist Li Sizhong published his original survey of fish fauna of the region, but by the 2000s there were 26.

As typical of Asian rivers, Cyprinidae is by far the most diverse family in the Yellow River basin. More than 85 cyprinids have been recorded in this basin, including species that still are present and species that no longer are present. Other highly diverse families are the stone loaches (more than 20 species), gobies ( 15 species), true loaches ( 10 species) and bagrid catfish ( 10 species). Although there are species found throughout much of the river, several have a more restricted range. For example, the uppermost, highest parts on the Qinghai–Tibet Plateau has relatively few native species, notably snowtrout and allies (Gymnocypris, Gymnodiptychus, Platypharodon and Schizopygopsis), and Triplophysa loaches. Of the 18 endemics in the Yellow River basin, 12 are (or were) found in the upper part. These in particular have become threatened and the fish fauna in many headwaters are now dominated by introduced salmonids. In contrast, the lowermost part of the river and its delta are home to many brackish water or euryhaline species, like gobies (although there are also true freshwater gobies in the Yellow River), Asian seabasses, flatfish and Takifugu pufferfish.

Fishing remains an important activity, but catches have declined. In 2007, it was noted that 40% fewer fish were caught in the Yellow River compared to earlier catches. Large cyprinids (Asian carp, predatory carp, Wuchang bream and Mongolian redfin) and large catfish (Amur and Lanzhou catfish) are still present, but the largest species, the Chinese paddlefish, kaluga sturgeon and Yangtze sturgeon, have not been reported from the Yellow River basin in about 50 years. Other species that support important fisheries include white Amur bream, ayu, mandarin fish, Protosalanx icefish, northern snakehead, Asian swamp eel and others.

Annual fishing ban has been implemented since 2018, covering the entire Yellow River basin from 1 April to 30 June each year. A total ban of fishing of natural fishes is being implemented in the upper reaches of the Yellow River starting 1 April 2022, covering Qinghai, Sichuan and Gansu provinces, until the end of 2025.  For the rest of the basin, the annual ban is extended to a period from 1 April to 31 July.

Aquaculture

The Yellow River is generally less suitable for aquaculture than the rivers of central and southern China, such as the Yangtze or the Pearl River, but aquaculture is also practiced in some areas along the Yellow River. An important aquaculture area is the riverside plain in Xingyang City, upstream from Zhengzhou. Since the development of fish ponds started in Xingyang's riverside Wangcun Town in 1986, the pond systems in Wangcun have grown to the total size of 15,000 mu (10 km2), making the town the largest aquaculture center in North China.

Two turtle species are native to the Yellow River basin: the Chinese pond turtle and Chinese softshell turtle. Both species—but especially the softshell—are widely farmed for food. A variety of the Chinese softshell turtle popular in Chinese gourmets is called the Yellow River turtle. Nowadays most of the Yellow River turtles eaten in China's restaurants comes from turtle farms, which may or may not be near the Yellow River.
In 2007, construction started in Wangcun, Henan on a large farm for raising this turtle variety. With the capacity for raising 5 million turtles a year, the facility was expected to become Henan's largest farm of this kind.

The huge, entirely aquatic Chinese giant salamander, a species that has declined drastically due primarily to persecution for food and traditional medicine, is native to the Yellow River and other Chinese rivers. It is farmed in large numbers in several parts of China and genetic studies have revealed that the captive stock mostly is of Yellow River origin. As these often are released back into the wild, the Yellow River type of the Chinese giant salamander has spread to other parts of China, which represents a problem to the other types.

Pollution

On 25 November 2008, Tania Branigan of The Guardian filed a report "China's Mother River: the Yellow River", claiming that severe pollution has made one-third of China's Yellow River unusable even for agricultural or industrial use, due to factory discharges and sewage from fast-expanding cities. Level five is unfit for drinking, aquaculture, industrial use, or even agriculture. The report said waste and sewage discharged into the system last year totaled 4.29b tons. Industry and manufacturing made up 70% of the discharge into the river with households accounting for 23% and just over 6% coming from other sources.

In culture

In ancient times, it was believed that the Yellow River flowed from Heaven as a continuation of the Milky Way. In a Chinese legend, Zhang Qian is said to have been commissioned to find the source of the Yellow River. After sailing up-river for many days, he saw a girl spinning and a cow herd. Upon asking the girl where he was, she presented him with her shuttle with instructions to show it to the astrologer Yan Junping (嚴君平). When he returned, the astrologer recognized it as the shuttle of the Weaving Girl (Vega), and, moreover, said that at the time Zhang received the shuttle, he had seen a wandering star interpose itself between the Weaving Girl and the cow herd (Altair).

The provinces of Hebei and Henan derive their names from the Yellow River. Their names mean, respectively, "North of the River" and "South of the River", although the border between them historically has never been stable, and currently the border between Hebei and Henan is not the Yellow River, but the Zhang River instead.

Mother river, China's Sorrow, and cradle of Chinese civilization.
Traditionally, it is believed that the Chinese civilization originated in the Yellow River basin. The Chinese refer to the river as "the Mother River" and "the cradle of the Chinese civilization".
During the long history of China, the Yellow River has been considered a blessing as well as a curse and has been nicknamed both "China's Pride" and "China's Sorrow".

River of disaster
Despite Yellow River having a central role in the development of Chinese civilization on North China Plain, flooding and constant rerouting of the river have also caused many great disaster to population along the river for long, hence it is also known as a River of disaster, with the disaster brought by the River said as history of disaster in the development of Chinese civilization, and the management of Yellow River have been a great political trouble to various Chinese dynasties throughout the history since ancient time.

When the Yellow River flows clear
Sometimes the Yellow River is poetically called the "Muddy Flow". The Chinese idiom "when the Yellow River flows clear" is used to refer to an event that will never happen and is similar to the English expression "when pigs fly".

"The Yellow River running clear"  was reported as a good omen during the reign of the Yongle Emperor, along with the appearance of such auspicious legendary beasts as qilin (an African giraffe brought to China by a Bengal embassy aboard Zheng He's ships in 1414) and zouyu (not positively identified) and other strange natural phenomena.

See also 

 Central Plain (China)
 Geography of China
 He Bo
 List of rivers in China
 North China Plain
 North China University of Water Conservancy and Electric Power
 Water resources of China
 Yellow River Cantata
 Yellow River Map
 Yellow River Piano Concerto
 Yellow Sea
 Red River (disambiguation)

References

External links 

 The DELIGHT Project, Delta Information System for Geoenvironmental and Human Habitat Transition
 Listen to the Yellow River Ballade from the Yellow River Cantata
 First raft descent  of the Yellow River from its source in Qinghai to its mouth (1987)
 Climate Change Impacts and Adaptation Strategies in the Yellow River Basin – UNESCO report

 Works from the National Central Library about the Yellow River
 
 Illustrated Work on the Storage and Drainage Activities at the Lakes and Rivers of the Yellow River and the Grand Canal
 General Atlas Depicting the Conditions of the Yellow River Dykes in Henan Province

 
Drainage basins of the Pacific Ocean
North China Plain
Rivers of Gansu
Rivers of Henan
Rivers of Inner Mongolia
Rivers of Ningxia
Rivers of Qinghai
Rivers of Shaanxi
Rivers of Shandong
Rivers of Shanxi
Rivers of Sichuan